Palanpur Junction railway station is a major railway station located in Palanpur, Gujarat, India. The railway station is under the administrative control of Western Railway of Indian Railways. Palanpur Junction railway station has five platforms and a total of six tracks.

Overview
Palanpur Junction railway station, on the Delhi–Ahmedabad main line, comes under the administrative control of Western Railway zone of the Indian Railways. It has direct rail links on the broad gauge to the cities of Chennai, Thiruvananthapuram,  Mysore, Bangalore, Pune, Mumbai, Jaipur, Jodhpur, Delhi, Dehradun, Muzaffarpur, Bareilly and Jammu. It is connected to most of the cities and towns in Gujarat such as Ahmedabad, Surat, Vadodra, Bhuj, Rajkot, Jamnagar, Porbandar and  Gandhidham. Indian Railways’ proposal to double the broad-gauge line between Palanpur and Samakhiali has received government backing. The doubling will benefit the districts of Kutch, Patan and Banaskantha in the state of Gujarat.

See also 

 Gandhidham Junction railway station
 Bhuj railway station

References 

Railway stations in Banaskantha district
Ahmedabad railway division
Railway junction stations in Gujarat